Paul Scapicchio is president and CEO of the Novus Group's Government Affairs Division and a former member of the Boston City Council (1997 to 2006, representing East Boston and Chinatown).

Career
He was a judicial clerk for the Honorable Gerald Gillerman of the Massachusetts Appeals Court. While on the Boston City Council, he served as Vice President as well as chairing the Committees on Aviation, Transportation, Intergovernmental Relations, and Economic Development.

Education
Scapicchio graduated from the Boston Latin School and went on to earn a B.A. from Tufts University, J.D. from Northeastern University School of Law, and a Masters of Public Administration from Harvard University's Kennedy School of Government.

References

American chief executives
Boston City Council members
Boston Latin School alumni
Tufts University alumni
Northeastern University School of Law alumni
Harvard Kennedy School alumni
Year of birth missing (living people)
Living people